Net Force may refer to:
 Net force, the overall force acting on an object
 NetForce (film), a 1999 American television film
 Tom Clancy's Net Force, a novel series
 Tom Clancy's Net Force Explorers, a young adult novel series